Etienne Antheunis (born 15 June 1947) is a Belgian racing cyclist. He rode in the 1970 Tour de France.

References

External links
 

1947 births
Living people
Belgian male cyclists